The Berezan is a Ukrainian river flowing into the Berezan Estuary of the Black Sea. The river is 49 km long, the catchment area is 890 km2. Slope 1.5 m / km. The trapezoidal river valley is 2 km wide. The channel is meandering, in the upper reaches 5 m wide, 1.2–1.5 m deep. In the summer it partially dries up. It is used for irrigation.

The river originates from the village of Stepove and flows through the territory of Voznesensk and Mykolaiv Raions of Mykolaiv Oblast.

In 1974, near the village of Yablonya, in the Berezan River basin, burial 11 of mound 11 was investigated, which belongs to the  Sivashovka-type monuments of the 2nd half of the 7th century - early 8th century.

Etymology 
Vladimir Nikonov (1904 - 1988) indicates that the name may be derived from the Avestan berezant, Scythian bresant, which means high.

History
In ancient times, the river was in Sarmatia and was named Sagaris. The Beresan District of Black Sea German colonists was located on the Berezan in the 19th century, when the area was known as South Russia. From 1809 to 1820, eleven German-Russian "mother colonies" were founded in the Beresan Valley: seven Catholic (Karlsruhe, Katharinental, Landau, München, Rastadt, Speyer, and Sulz) and four Lutheran (Johannestal, Rohrbach, Waterloo, and Worms).

See also
Berezan Estuary
Berezan Island
Berezan' Runestone

Further reading 
 Resources of surface waters of the USSR. Description of rivers and lakes and calculations of the main characteristics of their regime. - T. 6. Ukraine and Moldova. Issue 1. Western Ukraine and Moldova (excluding the Dniester basin). - L., Gidrometeoizdat, 1978. - 260-263 p.

References

External links
German foundations on the Beresan
Historic Map of Berezan, Kherson, South Russia
 
Tributaries of the Black Sea
Rivers of Mykolaiv Oblast